The Australia cricket team toured South Africa between February and April 2018 to play four Test matches. It was the first four-Test series between the two teams since South Africa's readmission. Prior to the start of the tour, South African fast-bowler Morné Morkel announced that he would retire from international cricket at the end of the series. During the third Test, Morkel became the fifth bowler for South Africa to take 300 Test wickets.

The series was known for an Australian ball-tampering scandal, culminating in the bans of three Australian cricketers and the restructure of the Australian cricket governing body. During the third Test, Australian batsman Cameron Bancroft was charged with ball tampering. Captain Steve Smith and Bancroft admitted the ball tampering to match referee Andy Pycroft and the media. Consequently, Smith and vice-captain David Warner stood down from the team leadership, and wicket-keeper Tim Paine was appointed acting captain for the remainder of the match.

On 27 March 2018, Smith, Warner and Bancroft were all suspended by Cricket Australia and sent home, with Paine named as the captain for the fourth and final Test. The following day, Cricket Australia banned Smith and Warner for one year, with Bancroft receiving a nine-month ban. Although Warner will not be considered for a leadership position in the future, Smith and Bancroft will not be considered to leadership positions for a minimum of 12 months after the completion of their bans. After the three players had returned home, Darren Lehmann, Australia's coach, announced that he would step down from his role after the conclusion of the fourth Test in Johannesburg.

South Africa went on to win the Test series 3–1. It was the first time that South Africa had beaten Australia at home since 1970.

Squads

Jackson Bird was replaced in Australia's squad by Chadd Sayers before the tour began due to injury. South Africa's Kagiso Rabada was given a two-match ban by the International Cricket Council (ICC) after he made contact with Australia's captain, Steve Smith, during the second Test, initially ruling him out of the rest of the series. On 20 March 2018, Rabada's two-match ban was overturned by the ICC, therefore allowing him to play in the rest of the series. For the last two Tests of the series, Duanne Olivier and Chris Morris were added to South Africa's squad.

Following the suspension of Steve Smith, David Warner and Cameron Bancroft after the third Test, Joe Burns, Glenn Maxwell and 
Matt Renshaw were added to Australia's squad for the fourth Test.

Tour match

Three-day match: South Africa A v Australia

Test series

1st Test

2nd Test

3rd Test

Ball tampering

On the third day of the third Test, Australia's Cameron Bancroft was shown on television coverage, also shown live at the ground, to have tampered with the ball with a small, yellow object. Bancroft later revealed the object to be a short length of yellow adhesive tape to which dirt and grit had adhered, forming an abrasive surface, though four days later, Cricket Australia confirmed that the object was actually sandpaper. At the end of the day's play, both Bancroft and captain Steve Smith admitted to ball tampering, with Smith knowing of the plan in advance of Bancroft's actions. Andy Pycroft, the match referee, charged Bancroft with a Level 2 offence of attempting to alter the condition of the ball. Smith said it was a "big mistake" but stated he would not be standing down.

Smith and vice-captain David Warner subsequently stood aside from leadership roles for the remainder of the Test, with Tim Paine taking over as acting captain. The International Cricket Council (ICC) suspended Smith for one match, handed him four demerit points and fined him 100% of his match fee. Cameron Bancroft was handed three demerit points and fined 75% of his match fee.

On 27 March 2018, Cricket Australia CEO James Sutherland announced that as a result of the preliminary investigation Smith, Warner and Bancroft had been charged with bringing the game into disrepute, suspended and sent home. Matt Renshaw, Joe Burns and Glenn Maxwell were recalled to the squad for the fourth Test to replace them. On 28 March, Cricket Australia released their findings and the sanctions to be imposed. Smith and Bancroft respectively received 12 and 9 month bans from international and domestic cricket in Australia, and neither would be considered for a leadership role for a further 12 months after that ban finishes. Warner received an identical 12 month ban, and would never be considered again for a leadership position. All three were encouraged to return to club level cricket to reconnect with the general cricket community.

4th Test

Notes

References

External links

 Series home at ESPN Cricinfo

2018 in Australian cricket
2018 in South African cricket
International cricket competitions in 2017–18
Australian cricket tours of South Africa
Cricket controversies